Haugan may refer to:

People
See Haugan (name)

Places
Iceland
Hauganes – Icelandic village
Norway
Fru Haugans Hotel – historic hotel in Helgeland, Norway
Haugan, Røros – Norwegian National Weather Station in Sør-Trøndelag, Norway
Haugan, Tolga –  village in Hedmark, Norway
United States
Haugan, Montana –  unincorporated area in Mineral County, Montana
Haugan Mountain –  summit in Mineral County, Montana

Other
Haugan & Lindgren – American banking firm
Haugan House – American open air exhibition
Haugean –  Norwegian state church reform movement